HP Technology Services is a business unit within the HP Enterprise Business division of Hewlett-Packard (HP), a large information technology  (IT) vendor.  HP Technology Services provides IT design, planning, implementation, integration and maintenance services and support for organizations and government agencies. The group also offers business and technology consulting services.

History
In May 2012, HP merged its Technology Services business unit with its Enterprise Servers, Storage and Networking (ESSN) business unit, under David Donatelli, executive vice president and general manager of the ESSN business unit to form Enterprise Group (EG).

Services
The HP Technology Services group focuses on helping organizations improve their IT operations and transition to new technologies, such as virtualization, cloud computing and Converged Infrastructure. HP supports its own products.  Its service offerings span most facets of an IT environment, including data centers, storage systems, enterprise software, communications networks, desktop computers, mobile devices and printers.

HP Technology Services offers a broad portfolio including HP Storage Consulting Services, announced in early June 2011, designed to help customers plan and deploy enterprise storage environments as they ready their infrastructure for cloud services.
HP Strategic IT Advisory Services offers guidance for cloud computing, enterprise architecture and service management.  IT Advisory Services also help CIOs build their IT strategy to align directly with that of the business and innovate in their industries with business services powered by technology.

References

External links
  HP Technology Services official Website

Technology Services